All That Jazz was the final studio album by vocalist Ella Fitzgerald, released in 1990. Fitzgerald's performance on this album won her the Grammy Award for Best Jazz Vocal Performance, Female, at the 33rd Grammy Awards.

Reviewing the album in The New York Times, music critic Stephen Holden wrote, "Although the voice of the first lady of song has lost much of its heavenly sweetness, the years have not seriously undermined many of her other qualities, most particularly her rhythmic acuity."

Track listing
For the 1992 Pablo CD Issue, PACD-2310-938-2
"Dream a Little Dream of Me" (Milton Adolphus, Gus Kahn) – 5:00
"My Last Affair" (Haven Johnson) – 4:34
"Baby, Don't You Quit Now" (Johnny Mercer, Jimmy Rowles) – 5:09
"Oh! Look at Me Now" (Joe Bushkin, John DeVries) – 5:10
"Jersey Bounce" (Tiny Bradshaw, Buddy Feyne, Edward Johnson, Bobby Plate) – 3:44
"When Your Lover Has Gone" (Einar Aaron Swan) – 5:00
"That Old Devil Called Love" (Doris Fisher, Allan Roberts) – 4:49
"All That Jazz" (Benny Carter, Al Stillman) – 4:04
"Just When We're Falling in Love" (Robbins' Nest) (Illinois Jacquet, Bob Russell, Lucky Thompson) – 5:24
"Good Morning Heartache" (Ervin Drake, Dan Fisher, Irene Higginbotham) – 5:28
"Little Jazz" (Roy Eldridge, Buster Harding) – 5:37
"The Nearness of You" (Hoagy Carmichael, Ned Washington) – 7:09

Source:

Personnel
Ella Fitzgerald – vocals
Kenny Barron – piano
Mike Wofford – piano
Ray Brown – double bass
Benny Carter – alto saxophone
Harry "Sweets" Edison – trumpet
Clark Terry – trumpet
Al Grey – trombone
Bobby Durham – drums
Angel Balestier – engineer

References

1990 albums
Ella Fitzgerald albums
Pablo Records albums
Albums produced by Norman Granz
Grammy Award for Best Jazz Vocal Performance, Female